In mathematics, specifically in the field of finite group theory, the Sylow theorems are a collection of theorems named after the Norwegian mathematician Peter Ludwig Sylow that give detailed information about the number of subgroups of fixed order that a given finite group contains. The Sylow theorems form a fundamental part of finite group theory and have very important applications in the classification of finite simple groups.

The set of all Sylow -subgroups for a given prime  is sometimes written .

The Sylow theorems assert a partial converse to Lagrange's theorem. Furthermore, the number of Sylow -subgroups of a group for a given prime  is congruent to 1 (mod ).

Theorems

Motivation 
The Sylow theorems are a powerful statement about the structure of groups in general, but are also powerful in applications of finite group theory. This is because they give a method for using the prime decomposition of the cardinality of a finite group  to give statements about the structure of its subgroups: essentially, it gives a technique to transport basic number-theoretic information about a group to its group structure. From this observation, classifying finite groups becomes a game of finding which combinations/constructions of groups of smaller order can be applied to construct a group. For example, a typical application of these theorems is in the classification of finite groups of some fixed cardinality, e.g. .

Statement 
Collections of subgroups that are each maximal in one sense or another are common in group theory.

The following theorems were first proposed and proven by Ludwig Sylow in 1872, and published in Mathematische Annalen.

The following weaker version of theorem 1 was first proved by Augustin-Louis Cauchy, and is known as Cauchy's theorem.

Consequences 
The Sylow theorems imply that for a prime number  every Sylow -subgroup is of the same order, . Conversely, if a subgroup has order , then it is a Sylow -subgroup, and so is isomorphic to every other Sylow -subgroup.

Sylow theorems for infinite groups 
There is an analogue of the Sylow theorems for infinite groups. One defines a Sylow -subgroup in an infinite group to be a p-subgroup (that is, every element in it has -power order) that is maximal for inclusion among all -subgroups in the group.  Let  denote the set of conjugates of a subgroup

Examples 

A simple illustration of Sylow subgroups and the Sylow theorems are the dihedral group of the n-gon, D2n. For n odd, 2 = 21 is the highest power of 2 dividing the order, and thus subgroups of order 2 are Sylow subgroups. These are the groups generated by a reflection, of which there are n, and they are all conjugate under rotations; geometrically the axes of symmetry pass through a vertex and a side.

By contrast, if n is even, then 4 divides the order of the group, and the subgroups of order 2 are no longer Sylow subgroups, and in fact they fall into two conjugacy classes, geometrically according to whether they pass through two vertices or two faces. These are related by an outer automorphism, which can be represented by rotation through π/n, half the minimal rotation in the dihedral group.

Thus by Theorem 1, the order of the Sylow p-subgroups is p2n.

One such subgroup P, is the set of diagonal matrices  , x is any primitive root of  Fq. So, P is a subgroup where all its elements have orders which are powers of p. There are pn choices for both a and b, making |P| = p2n. This means P is a Sylow p-subgroup, which is abelian, as all diagonal matrices commute, and because Theorem 2 states that all Sylow p-subgroups are conjugate to each other, the Sylow p-subgroups of GL2(Fq) are all abelian.

Example applications
Since Sylow's theorem ensures the existence of p-subgroups of a finite group, it's worthwhile to study groups of prime power order more closely. Most of the examples use Sylow's theorem to prove that a group of a particular order is not simple. For groups of small order, the congruence condition of Sylow's theorem is often sufficient to force the existence of a normal subgroup. 
Example-1 Groups of order pq, p and q primes with p < q. 
Example-2 Group of order 30, groups of order 20, groups of order p2q, p and q distinct primes are some of the applications. 
Example-3 (Groups of order 60): If the order |G| = 60 and G has more than one Sylow 5-subgroup, then G is simple.

Cyclic group orders 
Some non-prime numbers n are such that every group of order n is cyclic.  One can show that n = 15 is such a number using the Sylow theorems:  Let G be a group of order 15 = 3 · 5 and n3 be the number of Sylow 3-subgroups. Then n3  5 and n3 ≡ 1 (mod 3). The only value satisfying these constraints is 1; therefore, there is only one subgroup of order 3, and it must be normal (since it has no distinct conjugates). Similarly, n5 must divide 3, and n5 must equal 1 (mod 5); thus it must also have a single normal subgroup of order 5. Since 3 and 5 are coprime, the intersection of these two subgroups is trivial, and so G must be the internal direct product of groups of order 3 and 5, that is the cyclic group of order 15. Thus, there is only one group of order 15 (up to isomorphism).

Small groups are not simple 
A more complex example involves the order of the smallest simple group that is not cyclic. Burnside's pa qb theorem states that if the order of a group is the product of one or two prime powers, then it is solvable, and so the group is not simple, or is of prime order and is cyclic. This rules out every group up to order 30 .

If G is simple, and |G| = 30, then n3 must divide 10 ( = 2 · 5), and n3 must equal 1 (mod 3). Therefore, n3 = 10, since neither 4 nor 7 divides 10, and if n3 = 1 then, as above, G would have a normal subgroup of order 3, and could not be simple. G then has 10 distinct cyclic subgroups of order 3, each of which has 2 elements of order 3 (plus the identity). This means G has at least 20 distinct elements of order 3.

As well, n5 = 6, since n5 must divide 6 ( = 2 · 3), and n5 must equal 1 (mod 5). So G also has 24 distinct elements of order 5. But the order of G is only 30, so a simple group of order 30 cannot exist.

Next, suppose |G| = 42 = 2 · 3 · 7. Here n7 must divide 6 ( =  2 · 3) and n7 must equal 1 (mod 7), so n7 = 1. So, as before, G can not be simple.

On the other hand, for |G| = 60 = 22 · 3 · 5, then n3 = 10 and n5 = 6 is perfectly possible. And in fact, the smallest simple non-cyclic group is A5, the alternating group over 5 elements. It has order 60, and has 24 cyclic permutations of order 5, and 20 of order 3.

Wilson's theorem 
Part of Wilson's theorem states that

for every prime p. One may easily prove this theorem by Sylow's third theorem. Indeed,  
observe that the number np of Sylow's p-subgroups  
On the other hand, . Hence, . So, .

Fusion results 
Frattini's argument shows that a Sylow subgroup of a normal subgroup provides a factorization of a finite group.  A slight generalization known as Burnside's fusion theorem states that if G is a finite group with Sylow p-subgroup P and two subsets A and B normalized by P, then A and B are G-conjugate if and only if they are NG(P)-conjugate.  The proof is a simple application of Sylow's theorem: If B=Ag, then the normalizer of B contains not only P but also Pg (since Pg is contained in the normalizer of Ag).  By Sylow's theorem P and Pg are conjugate not only in G, but in the normalizer of B.  Hence gh−1 normalizes P for some h that normalizes B, and then Agh−1 = Bh−1 = B, so that A and B are NG(P)-conjugate.  Burnside's fusion theorem can be used to give a more powerful factorization called a semidirect product: if G is a finite group whose Sylow p-subgroup P is contained in the center of its normalizer, then G has a normal subgroup K of order coprime to P, G = PK and P∩K = {1}, that is, G is p-nilpotent.

Less trivial applications of the Sylow theorems include the focal subgroup theorem, which studies the control a Sylow p-subgroup of the derived subgroup has on the structure of the entire group.  This control is exploited at several stages of the classification of finite simple groups, and for instance defines the case divisions used in the Alperin–Brauer–Gorenstein theorem classifying finite simple groups whose Sylow 2-subgroup is a quasi-dihedral group.  These rely on J. L. Alperin's strengthening of the conjugacy portion of Sylow's theorem to control what sorts of elements are used in the conjugation.

Proof of the Sylow theorems
The Sylow theorems have been proved in a number of ways, and the history of the proofs themselves is the subject of many papers, including Waterhouse, Scharlau, Casadio and Zappa, Gow, and to some extent Meo.

One proof of the Sylow theorems exploits the notion of group action in various creative ways. The group  acts on itself or on the set of its p-subgroups in various ways, and each such action can be exploited to prove one of the Sylow theorems. The following proofs are based on combinatorial arguments of Wielandt.

Algorithms 
The problem of finding a Sylow subgroup of a given group is an important problem in computational group theory.

One proof of the existence of Sylow p-subgroups is constructive: if H is a p-subgroup of G and the index [G:H] is divisible by p, then the normalizer N = NG(H) of H in G is also such that [N : H] is divisible by p.  In other words, a polycyclic generating system of a Sylow p-subgroup can be found by starting from any p-subgroup H (including the identity) and taking elements of p-power order contained in the normalizer of H but not in H itself. The algorithmic version of this (and many improvements) is described in textbook form in Butler, including the algorithm described in Cannon. These versions are still used in the GAP computer algebra system.

In permutation groups, it has been proven, in Kantor and Kantor and Taylor, that a Sylow p-subgroup and its normalizer can be found in polynomial time of the input (the degree of the group times the number of generators).  These algorithms are described in textbook form in Seress, and are now becoming practical as the constructive recognition of finite simple groups becomes a reality.  In particular, versions of this algorithm are used in the Magma computer algebra system.

See also 

 Frattini's argument
 Hall subgroup
 Maximal subgroup
 p-group

Notes

References

Proofs

Algorithms

External links 
 
 
 
 

Theorems about finite groups
P-groups
Articles containing proofs